Roberto Júnior "Gatito" Fernández Torres (born 29 March 1988) is a Paraguayan footballer who plays as a goalkeeper for Campeonato Brasileiro Série A club Botafogo.

He is known as Gatito for being the son of former Paraguayan 1986 World Cup goalkeeper Roberto Fernández, nicknamed Gato. Because of his father, who was goalkeeper of brazilian clubs, such as Internacional and Palmeiras, Gatito had lived in Brazil before his professional days.

Career

Club career
Fernández started his professional career with Paraguayan Primera División club Cerro Porteño in 2007. He became Paraguayan champion with the club in the 2009 Apertura. Following the achievement, he joined Argentine Primera División side Estudiantes de La Plata. After a season in the club without any first team appearance, he joined Racing.

Utrecht (loan)
In August 2011, Utrecht announced to have signed Fernández on loan for one year to cover a possible departure of Michel Vorm.

Botafogo
On 26 November 2016 Fernandéz signed with Botafogo, on a free transfer, a two-year contract until December 2018.

On 9 April 2018, after good performances in the 2017 Copa Libertadores and 2018 Campeonato Carioca, Botafogo extended contract with Fernandéz until December 2021.

On 6 October 2022, he became the foreign player with the most appearences for Botafogo, surpassing his teammate Joel Carli with 188 games.

International career
He debuted with the Paraguayan U20 national team in the 2007 South American Youth Championship replacing injured Blas Hermosilla. He was selected for Paraguay senior squad for the 2011 Copa América. He was an un-used substitute for the squad as they finished the tournament as the runner-up.

Career statistics

Club

International

Honours

Club
Cerro Porteño
Primera División: 2009

Estudiantes de la Plata
FIFA Club World Cup Runner-up: 2009

Botafogo
Campeonato Carioca: 2018
Campeonato Brasileiro Série B: 2021

International
Paraguay
Copa América Runner-up: 2011

Individual
Copa do Brasil Best Goalkeeper: 2017
Troféu EFE Brasil: 2017

References

External links
 
 
 

1988 births
Living people
Sportspeople from Asunción
Paraguayan footballers
Association football goalkeepers
Paraguayan expatriate footballers
Paraguayan Primera División players
Argentine Primera División players
Eredivisie players
Campeonato Brasileiro Série A players
Campeonato Brasileiro Série B players
Cerro Porteño players
Estudiantes de La Plata footballers
Racing Club de Avellaneda footballers
FC Utrecht players
Esporte Clube Vitória players
Figueirense FC players
Botafogo de Futebol e Regatas players
2011 Copa América players
2019 Copa América players
Paraguay under-20 international footballers
Paraguay international footballers
Paraguayan expatriate sportspeople in Argentina
Paraguayan expatriate sportspeople in Brazil
Expatriate footballers in Argentina
Expatriate footballers in the Netherlands
Expatriate footballers in Brazil